Oud-Bodegraven is a village in the Dutch province of South Holland. It is a part of the municipality of Bodegraven, and lies about 7 km north of Gouda.

The statistical area "Oud-Bodegraven", which also can include the surrounding countryside, has a population of around 110.

References

Populated places in South Holland